KCMC-FM is a radio station airing a classic rock format licensed to Viola, Arkansas, broadcasting on 94.3 MHz FM.  The station serves the areas of Mountain Home, Arkansas, Horseshoe Bend, Arkansas, and Cherokee Village, Arkansas, and is owned by Monte and Gentry Spearman, through licensee High Plains Radio Network, LLC.

History
KSMZ was licensed by the FCC on May 9, 2007. In 2012, they changed callsigns to KCMC-FM. In 2020, they switched from a classic country format branded as “Mountain Country” with a slogan of “Pure Country Music” to “Arkansas Rocks”, a chain of radio stations in Arkansas.

Previous Logos

References

External links
KCMC-FM's official website

Classic country radio stations in the United States
CMC-FM